Idabel is a city in and county seat of McCurtain County, Oklahoma, United States. The population was 7,010 at the 2010 census. It is located in the southeast corner of Oklahoma, a tourist area known as Choctaw Country.

History

Idabel was established in 1902 by the Arkansas and Choctaw Railway (later part of the St. Louis and San Francisco Railway, the line now being operated by the Kiamichi Railroad). The city was first named Purnell, after Isaac Purnell, a railroad official. When postal officials rejected that designation, the name was changed to Mitchell, honoring another railroad company officer. Postal officials also rejected because another post office of that name existed elsewhere in the territory. They named the post office Bokhoma (a Choctaw word meaning Red River), which opened December 15, 1902. Railroad officials then chose the name Idabel, a compound of the names of Isaac Purnell's two daughters, Ida and Bell. The post office was then renamed Idabel.

At the time of its founding, Idabel was located in Bok Tuklo County, a part of the Apukshunubbee District of the Choctaw Nation.

For its first four years, Idabel local government was the responsibility of the Choctaw tribe for the Indians themselves. The national government was responsible for enforcing the law among non-Choctaws. In 1906, the citizens elected their first mayor and established a mayor-council form of government. At the time of statehood, November 16, 1907, the town was designated as the county seat of McCurtain County. A census in that year reported 726 residents. By 1910, the population had grown to 1,493. In 1920, there were 3,617 residents, but the number fell to 2,581 in 1930. Growth resumed by the end of the Great Depression in the late 1930s.

Idabel residents elected their first African American mayor in April 2019, mayor Craig Young.

2022 tornado
On November 4, 2022, Idabel was hit by a destructive EF4 tornado. The tornado warranted a tornado emergency and was at EF3 strength when it struck the city. It caused heavy damage, mainly to the southeast portion of the city.

Geography

Climate
The climate in this area is characterized by hot, humid summers and generally mild to cool winters.  According to the Köppen Climate Classification system, Idabel has a humid subtropical climate, abbreviated "Cfa" on climate maps.

Demographics

As of the census of 2020, there were 6,961 people, 2,707 households, and 1,790 families residing in the city. The racial makeup of the city was 46.39% White, 22.61% African American, 10.86% Native American, 0.46% Asian, 1.81% Pacific Islander, 5.56% from other races, and 12.31% from two or more races. Hispanic or Latino of any race were 10.37% of the population.

As of the census of 2000, there were 7,658 people, 2,735 households, and 1,785 families residing in the city. The population density was 436.3 people per square mile (168.5/km). There were 3,129 housing units at an average density of 196.4 per square mile (75.8/km). The racial makeup of the city was 56.99% White, 24.45% African American, 10.44% Native American, 0.30% Asian, 0.01% Pacific Islander, 3.37% from other races, and 4.43% from two or more races. Hispanic or Latino of any race were 4.96% of the population.

There were 2,735 households, out of which 34.4% had children under the age of 18 living with them, 39.6% were married couples living together, 21.2% had a female householder with no husband present, and 34.7% were non-families. 31.6% of all households were made up of individuals, and 12.9% had someone living alone who was 65 years of age or older. The average household size was 2.45 and the average family size was 3.08.

In the city, the population was spread out, with 29.5% under the age of 18, 9.2% from 18 to 24, 26.0% from 25 to 44, 20.7% from 45 to 64, and 14.6% who were 65 years of age or older. The median age was 34 years. For every 100 females, there were 85.6 males. For every 100 females age 18 and over, there were 81.0 males.

The median income for a household in the city was $20,496, and the median income for a family was $24,189. Males had a median income of $24,182 versus $16,958 for females. The per capita income for the city was $12,241. About 28.7% of families and 31.3% of the population were below the poverty line, including 42.5% of those under age 18 and 18.4% of those age 65 or over.

Transportation
Idabel is served by US-259, US-70, SH-3, and SH-37.

McCurtain County Regional Airport (FAA ID: 4O4) is 2 miles northwest of Idabel, and features a 5002 x 75 ft. paved runway.

Commercial air transportation is available out of Texarkana Regional Airport, about 73 miles southeast.

Idabel has rail freight service through the Kiamichi Railroad.

Economy
Initially, timber was the basis for the local economy, but this was supplanted by cotton production after the nearby forests were cleared. One cotton gin operated in Idabel in 1904, but six were in business in 1930. However, the Great Depression, depleted soil and destructive pests essentially wiped out this industry around Idabel. Landowners converted their properties to pastures and expanded beef production. Chicken farms were also established in the area and marginal agricultural land was turned into pine plantations.

Parks, recreation and attractions
Parks actually within Idabel include Garvin City Park.

Little River National Wildlife Refuge is to the northeast; further to the northeast are Broken Bow Lake, Beavers Bend State Park, Hochatown State Park (now part of Beavers Bend), McCurtain County Game Reserve, and the Carson Creek Recreation Area.  To the southeast is the Red Slough Wildlife Management Area.

The Museum of the Red River houses art as well as archaeology, including Acrocanthosaurus atokensis, the Oklahoma State Dinosaur.

The Barnes-Stevenson House is a 1912 restored Victorian house complete with period furnishings, and is on the National Register of Historic Places listings in McCurtain County, Oklahoma.  Other Idabel locales on the list include the Frisco Station, the Idabel Armory, the Rouleau Hotel, and the Spaulding-Olive House.

Education

Public schools
Idabel Public Schools serves the community.
 Idabel High School - Grades 9–12
 Idabel Middle School - Grades 6–8
 Central Elementary - Grades 3–5
 Idabel Primary South - Grades 1–2 PRE-K–K
 EvenStart - Ages 2–4
 Southeast Elementary - pre-k–4–Adult Ed
 Denison Elementary - Pre-Kindergarten - 8th

Advanced education
 Kiamichi Technology Center
 Southeastern Oklahoma State University, McCurtain County campus (formerly called the ET Dunlap Center)
 Eastern Oklahoma State College

Notable people
 Vice Admiral Phillip Balisle, United States Navy
 Randall Burks, former professional football player
 Ray Burris, professional baseball player
 Hadley Caliman, jazz musician
 Robert Evans, podcaster and journalist
 Earl Grant, organist
 Jeff Keith, lead singer for the rock band Tesla
 Sunny Murray, jazz drummer, composer and band leader
 Harold Stevenson, artist (1929-2018)
 Countess Vaughn, actress

References

External links 

 Idabel Public Library
 Idabel Public Schools
 McCurtain County OSU Extension Center
 Encyclopedia of Oklahoma History and Culture - Idabel

Cities in Oklahoma
Cities in McCurtain County, Oklahoma
County seats in Oklahoma
Populated places established in 1902
1902 establishments in Indian Territory
Cities in the Ark-La-Tex